The Selkirk transmitting station is a telecommunications facility located next to Lindean Loch, near Selkirk in the Scottish Borders. It is owned and operated by Arqiva.

Services
It is the main television broadcasting station for the Borders area, and is the first high power main station in the United Kingdom to be upgraded as part of digital switchover. This upgrade was completed on 20 November 2008, when the analogue signal was turned off and replaced by high power digital television signals.

Selkirk also broadcasts a number of radio services, including local commercial station Radio Borders, national station Classic FM, and DAB multiplexes from the BBC and Digital One.

History

Selkirk was built by the Independent Television Authority (ITA) in 1961 in order to bring ITV to south east Scotland, using the 405 line monochrome system on VHF channel 13. 405 line television was discontinued in the UK in 1985. 625 line UHF television was introduced at Selkirk in 1972, carrying BBC1 (channel 55), BBC2 (channel 62) and ITV (channel 59). Channel 4 was added on channel 65 when it launched in November 1982, and Channel 5 was added on channel 52 in March 1997. Radio Borders started from Selkirk in January 1990, with Classic FM following in November 1996. The Digital One and BBC DAB services both commenced in October 2007. BBC national FM services are transmitted from neighbouring Ashkirk transmitting station.

Channels listed by frequency

Digital television

Analogue radio (FM VHF)

Digital radio (DAB)

See also
List of masts
List of tallest buildings and structures in Great Britain
List of radio stations in the United Kingdom

References

External links
Entry for Selkirk transmitting station at The Transmission Gallery
Selkirk Transmitter at thebigtower.com

Transmitter sites in Scotland